Shangri-La is the fourth solo studio album by British singer-songwriter and guitarist Mark Knopfler, released on 28 September 2004 by Mercury Records internationally and Warner Bros. Records in the United States. Shangri-La received generally favorable reviews.

Background
In March 2003, Knopfler was involved in a motorbike crash in Grosvenor Road, Belgravia, and suffered a broken collarbone, broken shoulder blade, and seven broken ribs. The planned Ragpicker's Dream Tour was subsequently cancelled. Knopfler spent seven months away from the guitar in physiotherapy, but eventually recovered and was able to return to the studio in 2004 for his fourth album and supporting tour the following year.

Recording
Shangri-La was recorded in February 2004 at Shangri-La Studios in Malibu, California.

Composition
The album features Knopfler's signature storytelling style of songwriting. The album's first single, "Boom, Like That", was inspired by Ray Kroc's autobiography, Grinding It Out, and the starting of McDonald's, using many of Mr. Kroc's exact words. "Song for Sonny Liston" is a song about the famous boxer, Sonny Liston. "Donegan's Gone" is about Scottish musician and singer Lonnie Donegan. "5.15 AM" tells the story of the 1967 "one-armed bandit murder". "Back to Tupelo" is about the life of Elvis Presley and his acting career. The album was released on LP, HDCD and in 5.1 Surround Sound on Super Audio CD (SACD) and DVD-Audio.

Touring

Knopfler supported the release of Shangri-La with the Shangri-La Tour, which consisted of three legs: South Africa, Asia, Australia, and New Zealand; Europe; and North America. The tour started on 28 February 2005 in Johannesburg, South Africa, and included 104 concerts in 95 cities, ending on 31 July 2005 in Vancouver, British Columbia, Canada. The tour included a five-night run at the Royal Albert Hall in London. The tour lineup included Mark Knopfler (guitar, vocals), Guy Fletcher (keyboards), Richard Bennett (guitar), Matt Rollings (piano), Glenn Worf (bass), and Chad Cromwell (drums).

Critical reception

Shangri-La received generally favorable reviews. In his review for AllMusic, James Christopher Monger gave the album three and a half out of five stars, noting that on this album, Knopfler abandoned the British folk and Celtic-influenced pop that populated his earlier solo albums and chose instead a "full-blown yet quiet and considerate collection of country-folk ballads and bluesy, midtempo dirges that revel in their uncharacteristic sparseness." Instead of writing about his brush with mortality—the wry "Don't Crash the Ambulance" aside—Knopfler uses his "warm baritone and effortless guitar work" to explore everything from the plight of the modern fisherman (on the beautiful and rustic "Trawlerman's Song"), to the entrepreneurial skills of McDonald's founder Ray Kroc (on "Boom, Like That"). Monger concludes:

In his review for The Music Box, John Metzger gave the album an "excellent" four out of five stars, writing that Knopfler has rarely sounded so relaxed and his arrangements so unassuming. Metzger continued:

In his review for MusicTap, George Bennett gave the album four out of five stars, calling Knopfler's Shangri-La the "best album of his solo career". Bennett writes that Knopfler has produced "the most melodic, tasteful, laid-back yet wholly engrossing tunes" of his solo career. Bennett concluded that Shangri-La contains the best music and lyrics of Knopfler's solo career—the first album to "stand up solidly to anything Dire Straits did."

Track listing
All songs were written by Mark Knopfler.

Personnel
Music
 Mark Knopfler – vocals, guitars
 Richard Bennett – guitars
 Jim Cox – piano, organ, harmonica
 Guy Fletcher – piano, organ
 Glenn Worf – bass guitar
 Chad Cromwell – drums
 Paul Franklin – pedal steel guitar

Production
 Mark Knopfler – producer
 Chuck Ainlay – producer, engineer
 Guy Fletcher – engineer
 Rupert Coulson – assistant engineer
 Bob Ludwig – mastering

Chart positions

Weekly charts

Year-end charts

Certifications and sales

References

External links
 Shangri-La at Mark Knopfler official website

Mark Knopfler albums
2004 albums
Albums produced by Mark Knopfler
Albums produced by Chuck Ainlay
Albums recorded at Shangri-La (recording studio)
Country folk albums
Folk albums by English artists
Country albums by English artists